Goodness! is the sixth album led by saxophonist Houston Person, which was recorded in 1969 and released on the Prestige label.

Reception

Allmusic awarded the album 4 stars, stating: "The music is generally quite commercial and is certainly not recommended to bebop purists, although it has some strong moments. But overall these performances succeed more as background music than as creative jazz".

Track listing 
All compositions by Houston Person except as noted
 "Hey Driver!" (Gloria Coleman) - 5:28  
 "Goodness" - 9:28  
 "Brother H." - 4:36  
 "Hard Times" (Paul Mitchell) - 6:16  
 "Jamilah" (Sonny Phillips) - 5:33  
 "Close Your Eyes" (Chuck Willis) - 6:30

Personnel 
Houston Person - tenor saxophone
Sonny Phillips - organ
Billy Butler - guitar
Bob Bushnell - electric bass
Frankie Jones - drums
Buddy Caldwell - congas

References 

Houston Person albums
1969 albums
Prestige Records albums
Albums produced by Bob Porter (record producer)
Albums recorded at Van Gelder Studio